The 2010 FIFA World Cup was an international football tournament held in South Africa from 11 June until 11 July 2010. The 32 national teams involved in the tournament were required to register a squad of 23 players; only players in these squads were eligible to take part in the tournament.

Before announcing their final squad for the tournament, teams were required to name a preliminary squad of 30 players by 11 May 2010, 30 days before the start of the tournament. With the exception of those involved in the 2010 UEFA Champions League Final, the players listed in the preliminary squad were then subjected to a mandatory rest period from 17 to 23 May 2010. The preliminary squad would then have to be cut to a final 23 by 1 June 2010 (midnight CET). Replacement of seriously injured players is permitted until 24 hours before the team in question's first World Cup game, though replacement players do not have to be drawn from the preliminary squad.

Players marked (c) were named as captain for their national squad. Number of caps, players' club teams and players' age as of 11 June 2010, the tournament's opening day.

For the first time in World Cup history, all teams had at least one player from a European club (North Korea being the only team with just one, Hong Yong-jo). Three national squads were made up entirely of players from domestic clubs: England, Italy and Germany. Nigeria was the only team with no players from domestic clubs.

Group A

France
Coach: Raymond Domenech

Mexico
Coach: Javier Aguirre

South Africa
Coach:  Carlos Alberto Parreira

Uruguay
Coach: Óscar Tabárez

Group B

Argentina
Coach: Diego Maradona

Greece
Coach: 
Otto Rehhagel

Nigeria
Coach:  Lars Lagerbäck

South Korea
Coach: Huh Jung-moo

Group C

Algeria
Coach: Rabah Saâdane

England
Coach:  Fabio Capello

Slovenia
Coach: Matjaž Kek

United States
Coach: Bob Bradley

Group D

Australia
Coach:  Pim Verbeek

Germany
Coach: Joachim Löw

Ghana
Coach:  Milovan Rajevac

Serbia
Coach: Radomir Antić

Group E

Cameroon
Coach:  Paul Le Guen

Denmark
Coach: Morten Olsen

Japan
Coach: Takeshi Okada

Netherlands
Coach: Bert van Marwijk

Group F

Italy
Coach: Marcello Lippi

New Zealand
Coach: Ricki Herbert

Paraguay
Coach:  Gerardo Martino

Slovakia
Coach: Vladimír Weiss

Group G

Brazil
Coach: Dunga

Ivory Coast
Coach:  Sven-Göran Eriksson

North Korea
Coach: Kim Jong-hun

Portugal
Coach: Carlos Queiroz

Group H

Chile
Coach:  Marcelo Bielsa

Honduras
Coach:  Reinaldo Rueda

Spain
Coach: Vicente del Bosque

Switzerland
Coach:  Ottmar Hitzfeld

Player statistics

Player representation by age

Players
Oldest:  David James
Youngest:  Christian Eriksen

Goalkeepers
Oldest:  David James
Youngest:  Daniel Agyei

Captains
Oldest:  Fabio Cannavaro
Youngest:  Marek Hamšík

Player representation by club

Player representation by league

The English, German, and Italian squads were made up entirely of players from the respective countries' domestic leagues. The Nigerian squad was made up entirely of players employed by overseas clubs. 
Although Russia, Turkey, and Scotland failed to qualify for the finals, their domestic leagues were represented by 14, 14, and 10 players respectively. Altogether, there were 52 national leagues that had players in the tournament.

Average age of squads

Coaches representation by country

References

Notes

External links
Official Players List
Preliminary Squads List

Squads
FIFA World Cup squads